Poropuntius daliensis is a species of cyprinid in the genus Poropuntius. It is considered harmless to humans.

References

Cyprinid fish of Asia
Fish of Vietnam
Taxa named by Wu Hsien-Wen
Taxa named by Lin Ren-Duan
Fish described in 1977